St. Gabriel's Episcopal Church is an historic Carpenter Gothic church in Titusville, Florida, United States. The church was built in 1887 on donated land and is located at 414 Pine Avenue. On December 5, 1972, it was added to the U.S. National Register of Historic Places.

Gallery

References

 Brevard County listings at National Register of Historic Places
 Florida's Office of Cultural and Historical Programs
 Brevard County listings
 Brevard County markers
 St. Gabriel's Episcopal Church

External links

 St. Gabriel's Episcopal Church website
 St. Gabriel's Episcopal Church history

Episcopal church buildings in Florida
National Register of Historic Places in Brevard County, Florida
Churches on the National Register of Historic Places in Florida
Carpenter Gothic church buildings in Florida
Churches in Brevard County, Florida
Buildings and structures in Titusville, Florida
1887 establishments in Florida
Churches completed in 1887